Thomas J. Sparrow (March 4, 1805 – December 22, 1870) was a prominent American architect active in the first half of the 19th century. Only three of his designs are known to be extant, with two of them now being listed on the National Register of Historic Places.

Early life
Sparrow was born in Portland, Maine, on March 4, 1805.

Career

Sparrow began in the organ-manufacturing business under John K. Paine. He then moved into carpentry and was listed as a joiner in the Portland Directory of 1837. Its next edition, four years later, showed him as being the city's first native professional architect.

He was active into the 1860s, when ill health prevented him from partaking in the rebuilding of Portland after the great fire of 1866.

Selected notable works
Sparrow Block, Portland, Maine (1849)
Captain Reuben Merrill House, Yarmouth, Maine (1858) – now listed on the National Register of Historic Places
Mechanics' Hall, Portland, Maine (1859) – now listed on the National Register of Historic Places

Death
Sparrow died on December 22, 1870, in Brownville, Maine, aged 65.

The Sparrow Lecture, held at Portland's Mechanics' Hall, is named in his honor.

References

1805 births
1870 deaths
19th-century American architects
Architects from Portland, Maine